Catch the Moon is an album by Lisa Loeb and Elizabeth Mitchell released in 2003 by Artemis Records. The album is a collection of children's music played in a folk music style. It comes in the form of a child's cardboard storybook written by Erin Courtney and illustrated by Bonnie Brook Mitchell. The CD slides out the top of the back cover.

Track listing
"The Big Rock Candy Mountain" – 2:45
"Little Red Caboose" – 2:22
"Oh Susanna" – 2:20
"Catch the Moon" – 3:10
"La Manita" – 1:37
"Twinkle Twinkle Little Star" – 2:14
"Stop and Go" – 2:29
"New Morning" – 3:46
"Oh Groundhog" – 2:43
"Butterfly (Mariposa)" – 2:32
"Donguri/Rolling Acorn" – 1:51
"Free Little Bird" – 2:11
"Fais Do Do" – 1:36

Personnel
 Lisa Loeb - Lead and backing vocals, Guitar, Banjo
 Elizabeth Mitchell - Lead and backing vocals, Tambourine, Fiddle, Wurlitzer electric piano
 Dan Littleton - Backup vocals, Guitar, Slide guitar, Bass, Harmonica, Piano, Organ, Wurlitzer electric piano, Bells & percussion
 Alexandre Sousa - Backup vocals
 Storey - Backup vocals

Production team
 Executive Producer: Michael Krumper
 Produced by Lisa Loeb, Elizabeth Mitchell
 Music composed by Warren Defever, Bob Dylan, Stephen Foster, Dan Littleton, Lisa Loeb, Elizabeth Mitchell
 Audio Engineers: Warren Defever, Lisa Loeb, Phillip Loeb, Elizabeth Mitchell
 Soundtrack Mastered by Steve Fallone

Music videos
Two music videos for the album were made for the songs "Catch the Moon" and "Stop & Go". Both of these were broadcast on Nickelodeon's Noggin and Nick Jr. channels in 2003.

References

2003 albums
Lisa Loeb albums
Elizabeth Mitchell (musician) albums
Artemis Records albums
Collaborative albums
Children's music albums by American artists
Covers albums